Charles Kuhn House is a historic home located at Indianapolis, Indiana.  It was built about 1879, and is a two-story, five bay, Italianate style brick dwelling.  It has a hipped roof with pressed metal brackets and a centered gable.

It was listed on the National Register of Historic Places in 1989.

References

Houses on the National Register of Historic Places in Indiana
Italianate architecture in Indiana
Houses completed in 1879
Houses in Indianapolis
National Register of Historic Places in Indianapolis
1879 establishments in Indiana